The Asat Trust is a business in Liechtenstein which represents the interests of other businesses in that state.

People 

 Erwin Wachter - company head as of 2003
 Martin Wachter - director as of 2003
 Prince Emanuel of Liechtenstein - board member (1970–1987)

Notable Relationships

Al Taqwa 

The Asat Trust has represented Al Taqwa Bank, a business of Youssef Nada and Ali Ghaleb Himmat,
which has been accused of financing al-Qaeda.

A lawsuit filed by the family of John P. O'Neill describes Asat as a "money laundering organization" founded by Youssef Nada.

LGT Bank 

Asat has a close relationship with the bank of the Liechtenstein royal family and has printed the name of that bank on its own letterhead.

It is common practice that a legal representative prints the name of a local bank on its own letterhead, indicating its own business account;

Galp Energia 

The Asat Trust represented Portuguese energy company Galp Energia in its business dealings with Iraq in the Oil-for-Food Programme. When the US placed sanctions on Asat, Galp continued this business through Sercor Treuhand Anstalt, a company closely related to Asat.

Sercor Treuhand Anstalt does not represent Galp Energia;

Wachter businesses 
Sercor Treuhand Anstalt, also known as SerMont Asset Management SA, is the business of Asat Trust directors Erwin Wachter and Martin Wachter.

Martin Wachter also owns Turicon Asset Management.

Sercor is not the business of "Asat" directors; Sercor Treuhand Anstalt and SerMont Asset Management are different companies; 
Erwin Wachter died November 2013;

Alleged Hamas relationship 

Asat represented K & A Overseas Trading, a business of Khairy H. Al-Agha and Saleh Kamel Jibreel, which the US government alleged to finance Hamas in the Holy Land Foundation trial.

Asat never represented the above companies; Asat was not involved in any financing as described above;

References 

Financial services companies of Liechtenstein